1,2,3-Trimethylbenzene is an organic compound with the chemical formula CH(CH).  Classified as an aromatic hydrocarbon, it is a flammable colorless liquid.    It is nearly insoluble in water but soluble in organic solvents.  It occurs naturally in coal tar and petroleum. It is one of the three isomers of trimethylbenzene. It is used in jet fuel, mixed with other hydrocarbons, to prevent the formation of solid particles which might damage the engine.

Production and uses
Industrially, it is isolated from the C aromatic hydrocarbon fraction during petroleum distillation. It is also generated by methylation of toluene and xylenes.

References 

Alkylbenzenes
C3-Benzenes